Vito Fazzi (1851–1918) was an Italian doctor and politician who lived in Lecce in the second half of the 19th century. His work was fundamental for the construction of the first big modern civil hospital in Lecce.

Biography

Life and personality
Vito Fazzi was born in Melpignano (Lecce) on 23 December 1851. He was the firstborn son of Gaetano Fazzi (1823-1890around), a renowned doctor in Lecce, and Concetta Gerardi (1832-1916), daughter of an important noble landowner. His wife, Adele Profilo, died at the age of 23 during the birth of her second daughter. According to a philological analysis, his name means “Faber Vitae”, that is “life maker”; this quality emerges in the speeches and epitaphs pronounced during his funeral.
A memorial of Vito Fazzi, a sculpture made by a famous artist, Guacci, was located and it is still today in the main hall of the hospital.

See also
Lecce
Lecce Province
Parliament

References

Bibliography
Luigi Alfonso, Gli ospedali di Lecce. Dallo Spirito Santo all'Oncologico, Edizioni Grifo, 2009

External links

1851 births
1918 deaths
19th-century Italian politicians
Italian hospital administrators
People from Lecce
Italian surgeons